Benjamin is a city in and the county seat of Knox County, Texas, United States. Its population was 258 at the 2010 census.

History
The community was founded in 1884 by Hilory G. Bedford, president and controlling stockholder in the Wichita and Brazos Stock Company. He named it Benjamin after his son, who had been killed by lightning. To attract additional settlers, Bedford gave his stockholders a 50-acre tract of land and set aside 40 more acres for a town square. Benjamin was designed as the Knox County seat when it was organized in 1886; a school also opened in that year. A jail built in 1887 still stands as a private residence, and the old bank stands next to the sheriff's office. Benjamin was incorporated in 1928, and the population was 485 in the 1930 census. Two structures in the community, a courthouse (1938) and school building (1942), were constructed with Works Projects Administration labor. That courthouse replaced the previous stone structure built in 1888. The number of inhabitants reached a high of 599 in 1940, but that figure slowly decreased during the latter half of the 20th century.

Geography
Benjamin is situated at the junction of U.S. Highway 82 and State Highway 6 in central Knox County, roughly 90 miles north of Abilene, around 160 miles west of Fort Worth, and 85 miles southwest of Wichita Falls.

Climate
According to the Köppen climate classification system, Benjamin has a semiarid climate, BSk on climate maps.

Demographics

2020 census

As of the 2020 United States census, there were 196 people, 78 households, and 45 families residing in the city.

2000 census
As of the census of 2000,  264 people, 97 households, and 64 families resided in the city. The population density was 254.5 people/sq mi (98.0/km2). The 119 housing units averaged 114.7/sq mi (44.2/km2). The racial makeup of the city was 89.77% White, 3.03% African American, 1.89% Asian, 4.92% from other races, and 0.38% from two or more races. Hispanics or Latinos of any race were 11.36% of the population.

Of the 97 households, 36.1% had children under the age of 18 living with them, 48.5% were married couples living together, 14.4% had a female householder with no husband present, and 33.0% were not families; 30.9% of all households were made up of individuals, and 19.6% had someone living alone who was 65 years of age or older. The average household size was 2.59 and the average family size was 3.31.

In the city, the age distribution was 33.3% under 18, 5.3% from 18 to 24, 25.8% from 25 to 44, 19.7% from 45 to 64, and 15.9% who were 65 or older. The median age was 38 years. For every 100 females, there were 88.6 males. For every 100 females age 18 and over, there were 85.3 males.

The median income for a household in the city was $31,023, and for a family was $38,125. Males had a median income of $29,750 versus $19,375 for females. The per capita income for the city was $13,138. About 14.5% of families and 14.2% of the population were below the poverty line, including 14.7% of those under the age of 18 and 8.7% of those 65 or over.

Arts and culture
The Knox County Museum, located in the county courthouse, features a barbed wire exhibit and numerous other frontier artifacts. The Knox County Veterans Memorial, located at the corner of U.S. Highway 82 and State Highway 6, honors all Knox County veterans from the Spanish–American War through current conflicts.

Benjamin's Moorhouse Park, dedicated by the state highway department in 1965, and an area know the Narrows located four miles east of the city are also popular tourist attractions.

Texas photographer Wyman Meinzer lives in Benjamin.

Education
The city of Benjamin is served by the Benjamin Independent School District and home to the Benjamin High School Mustangs.

References

Cities in Texas
Cities in Knox County, Texas
County seats in Texas